Ericeia congregata is a moth in the  family Erebidae. It is found in Angola, Cameroon, Cape Verde, the Comoros, the Democratic Republic of Congo, Gabon, Kenya, La Réunion, Madagascar, Mauritania, Mauritius, Sierra Leone, South Africa, Gambia, Uganda, Yemen, Saudi Arabia, India and Sri Lanka.

The larvae feed on Acacia tortilis.

References

Moths described in 1858
Ericeia